Lucian Mihai Dumitriu (born 21 September 1992) is a Romanian professional footballer who plays as a midfielder for Liga I club Petrolul Ploiești.

He previously represented teams such as Aerostar Bacău, SC Bacău or Foresta Suceava.

Honours
SC Bacău
Liga III: 2012–13

Hermannstadt
Cupa României runner-up: 2017–18

References

External links
 
 
 Lucian Dumitriu at lpf.ro

1992 births
Living people
Sportspeople from Bârlad
Romanian footballers
Association football midfielders
Liga I players
Liga II players
Liga III players
FC Hermannstadt players
LPS HD Clinceni players
CS Mioveni players
CS Aerostar Bacău players
ACS Foresta Suceava players
FC Petrolul Ploiești players